The Fabens–Caseta International Bridge was an international bridge which crossed the Rio Grande connecting the United States–Mexico border towns of Fabens, Texas, and Caseta, Chihuahua. The bridge was also known as Puente La Caseta. The two-lane bridge was constructed in 1938. The bridge was demolished in 2016 following the completion of the Tornillo-Guadalupe Bridge a few hundred yards to the west.

Border crossing

The Fabens Port of Entry was a port of entry at the Mexico–United States border, in the town of Fabens, Texas. It closed on November 17, 2014, and traffic was diverted to the nearby Tornillo Port of Entry.

See also
List of bridges documented by the Historic American Engineering Record in Texas

References

External links

Historic American Engineering Record in Texas
International bridges in Texas
International bridges in Chihuahua (state)
Toll bridges in Texas
Bridges completed in 1938
Transportation buildings and structures in El Paso County, Texas
Road bridges in Texas
Toll bridges in Mexico